The Italian 4th Division "Littorio" (Lictor) a regular Infantry Division which was fully motorized. It was formed as one of four divisions for the Corpo Truppe Volontarie during the Spanish Civil War by the Regio Esercito. On its return to Italy it was used to form the 133 Armoured Division Littorio.

Order of battle March 1, 1937 Battle of Guadalajara 

4th Division "Littorio" – Bgd. Gen. Annibale Bergonzoli
 1st Infantry Regiment – Colonel Daniele Pescarolo.
 1st Battalion
 2nd Battalion
 3rd Battalion
 Support Battery (65/17)
 Engineer Section
 2nd Infantry Regiment “Osa l’Inosabile” – Coronel Ugo Sprega.
 1st Battalion – Lt. Colonel Agostino Camurati
 2nd Battalion – Lt. Colonel Virginio Manari
 3rd Battalion – Lt. Colonel Angelo Sulas
 Support Battery (65/17)
 Engineer Section
 Division Machinegun Battalion – Major Antonio Luciano
 3rd Artillery Regiment – Colonel Giuseppe D'Amico
 Artillery Group (100/17)
 Artillery Group (100/17)
 AA Battery 20mm
 "Carabinieri" Section
 Intendencia Section
 Sanitation Section
 Division Truck Unit

Order of battle August 1937 
Division "Littorio" during the Battle of Santander

Assault Division "Littorio" – Annibale Bergonzoli 
 1st Infantry Regiment
 1st Battalion
 2nd Battalion
 3rd Battalion
 2nd Infantry Regiment
 1st Battalion
 2nd Battalion
 3rd Battalion
 3rd Artillery Regiment
 I Group 65/17
 II Group 65/17
 Group (100/17)
 Group (100/17)
 AA Battery 20mm
 "Carabinieri" Section
 Intendencia Section
 Sanitation Section

Order of battle March 1938 
Division "Littorio" during the Aragon Offensive.

Division "Littorio"  – Annibale Bergonzoli 
 1st Infantry Regiment
 1st Battalion
 2nd Battalion
 3rd Battalion
 Battery 65/17
 2nd Infantry Regiment
 1st Battalion
 2nd Battalion
 3rd Battalion
 Battery 65/17
 3rd Regiment of Blackshirts
 Battalion "Folgore"
 Battalion "Carroccio"
 Battalion "Temerario"
 Battery 65/17
 Assault Battalion
 Artillery Regiment
 I Group 75/27
 IV Group 75/27
 Group 100/17
 Group 20mm AA
 Group 37mm AT
 "Carabinieri" Section
 Intendencia Section
 Sanitation Section
 Engineer Section
 Division Truck Unit

Order of battle November 1938 
 Order of battle before the start of the Battle of Catalonia.

Division Littorio – Gervasio Bitossi 
 1st Infantry Regiment
 1st Battalion
 2nd Battalion
 3rd Battalion
 Support Battalion
 Battery 65/17
 2nd Blackshirt Regiment
 Battalion "Ardente"
 Battalion "Inflessibile"
 Battalion "Lupi"
 Battalion "Vampa"
 Battery 65/17
 Mortar Battalion
 1st Company 81mm
 2nd Company 81mm
 3rd Company 81mm
 Antitank Company 47/35
 Artillery Regiment
 Group 65/17
 Group 75/27
 Group 100/17
 AA Battery 20mm
 Engineer Company
 Radio Company

Sources 
de Mesa, José Luis, El regreso de las legiones: (la ayuda militar italiana à la España nacional, 1936–1939),  García Hispán, Granada:España, 1994 

Divisions of Italy in the Spanish Civil War
Infantry divisions of Italy in World War II